Nachindi is a village in the Punjab province of Pakistan.   It is part of the Union Council of Jand Khanzada in Chakwal Tehsil.  The population of Nachindi is about 4249.  A large percentage of the population works for the Pakistan Army and other defence-related departments.

Geography

References

Chakwal District
Populated places in Chakwal District